The 1994 Peters NSW Open was a combined men's and women's tennis tournament played on outdoor hard courts at the NSW Tennis Centre in Sydney, Australia that was part of the World Series of the 1994 ATP Tour and of Tier II of the 1994 WTA Tour. It was the 102nd edition of the tournament and was held from 10 January through 16 January 1994. Pete Sampras and Kimiko Date won the singles titles.

Finals

Men's singles

 Pete Sampras defeated  Ivan Lendl 7–6(7–5), 6–4
 It was Sampras' 1st title of the year and the 23rd of his career.

Women's singles

 Kimiko Date defeated  Mary Joe Fernández 6–4, 6–2
 It was Date's 1st title of the year and the 3rd of her career.

Men's doubles
 Darren Cahill /  Sandon Stolle defeated  Mark Kratzmann /  Laurie Warder 6–1, 7–6
 It was Cahill's only title of the year and the 15th of his career. It was Stolle's 1st title of the year and the 3rd of his career.

Women's doubles

 Patty Fendick /  Meredith McGrath defeated  Jana Novotná /  Arantxa Sánchez Vicario 6–2, 6–3
 It was Fendick's 1st title of the year and the 24th of her career. It was McGrath's 1st title of the year and the 10th of her career.

References

External links
 Official website
 ITF tournament edition details (men)
 ITF tournament edition details (women)

 
1990s in Sydney